The Battle of Fürth was fought on 3 September 1632 between the Catholic forces of Holy Roman Emperor Ferdinand II and the Protestant forces of King Gustavus II (Gustavus Adolphus) of Sweden during the period of Swedish intervention in the Thirty Years War.

The tactical victory by the Catholic forces allowed the Imperial army to quickly advance into Saxony, while the Swedish forces were forced into retreat.

Regional background

Fürth was a market town, whose marketing license had been suspended under Holy Roman Emperor Heinrich III, losing the privilege and all that went with it, to nearby Nürnberg (English: Nuremberg) shortly after its founding.  This situation changed after Heinrich's death, and in 1062 Fürth was once again permitted to have its own market.  However, Fürth could not readily compete with Nuremberg, which had steadily grown and prospered in the ensuing years.  In the following centuries, the City of Nuremberg became the most important town in the region, even making Fürth subservient to it at one point, despite Fürth's strategic importance.  The character of the settlement of Fürth remained afterward largely agricultural.  Consequently, in 1600 the population was probably still only 1000–2000.

Background
The town of Fürth is situated to the east and south of the rivers Rednitz and Pegnitz, which join to form the Regnitz to the northwest of the town center.  The ford across the Regnitz, the reason for the  original founding of the settlement, is the feature which gave Fürth its strategic importance as an access point to Nuremberg during the Protestant champion's, King Gustavus Adolphus of Sweden, campaign through Bavaria.

In spring of 1632, Gustavus Adolphus had handed the Habsburg Emperor, Ferdinand II, a major defeat at Rain, where the head of the Catholic army, Count Tilly, had fallen.  Subsequently, he had taken the Free Imperial City of Augsburg without struggle, and on 17 May had marched into Munich unmolested.  He subsequently occupied Nuremberg, encamping his army outside of the city.

Build-up

When Gustavus Adolphus marched on Fürth in late August 1632, it was arguably the greatest blunder in his German campaign.  His opponent in the battle, and Tilley's successor, was General Albrecht von Wallenstein, who had been recalled by the Emperor.  In the spring of 1632, Wallenstein had raised a fresh army within just a few weeks and had taken to the field.  He had quickly driven the Saxon army from Bohemia, and then advanced northwestward (aiming to campaign into Protestant-aligned Saxony).  Wallenstein set camp and built defensive earthworks at Fürth.  There he encountered Gustavus, who had previously fired the town of Fürth in June, and who had come back up from the south and taken Nuremberg in order to oppose Wallenstein's designs on Saxony.  Gustavus soon tested Wallenstein's strength at the Battle of the Alte Veste (the "old fort") in late August, which resulted in a nominal Catholic victory, and forced the Protestant forces to quickly encamp in a defensive position, being nearly cut off from additional help.  Gustavus, the experienced besieger, now found himself besieged by Wallenstein's much larger force.

The attack
Gustavus was finally reinforced on 1 September (N.S.).  There followed the disastrous 3 September (N.S.) attempt on Wallenstein's well-entrenched forces; where the Protestant's offensive force suffered 2500 casualties.  Gustavus could not thereafter successfully persuade Wallenstein to take to battle on an open field.  Wallenstein's post-battle tactic of maintaining a strictly defensive, well-fortified position paid off when, running short on provisions, Gustavus was forced to withdraw southward on 19 September (N.S.).  This left the two major opposing armies in the region in a stalemate which was not to be resolved until November's Battle of Lützen, which resulted in a very costly victory for the Protestant forces.

Aftermath
The immediate result of the Nuremberg campaign allowed the Habsburgs to advance into Saxony.  Fürth had been almost completely destroyed by fire prior to the siege (on 18–19 June), and was largely abandoned.  Gustavus died in the Battle of Lützen, a devastating battle (for both sides) which took place six weeks later.  In the next couple of years, Wallenstein's overcautious battlefield conduct and military errors led to his falling out of favor with the Emperor.  Combined with his growing ambition and political intrigue, Wallenstein fell victim to an assassin in 1634 with the Emperor's approval.

References

Fürth
Furth
Furth
Furth
1632 in the Holy Roman Empire
Fürth
Gustavus Adolphus of Sweden
Albrecht von Wallenstein
Fürth